Agen-d'Aveyron is a commune in the Aveyron department situated in the Occitanie region in southern France.

It is located 10 km east of Rodez, 15 km west of Laissac and 50 km northwest of Millau.

Agen-d'Aveyron is in the ancient province of Rouergue and is the site of a prehistoric dolmen.

Population

See also
Communes of the Aveyron department

References

Communes of Aveyron